Sir John Tyssen Tyrell, 2nd Baronet (21 December 1795 – 19 September 1877), of Boreham House, near Chelmsford, Essex, was an English Conservative Party politician.

Family
Tyrell was the eldest son of Sir John Tyrell, 1st Baronet and Sarah Tyssen, the daughter and heiress of William Tyssen of Cheshunt, Hertfordshire. Tyrell was educated at Felsted School and Winchester College before being admitted to Trinity College, Cambridge in 1813. In 1814 he migrated college to Jesus College. On 19 May 1819, he married Elizabeth Ann Pilkington, the daughter of Sir Thomas Pilkington, 7th Baronet. They had two sons and three daughters.

Career
Tyrell was a Member of Parliament (MP) for Essex from 1830 to 1831. Succeeding his father as Baronet in 1832, he sat as MP for North Essex from 1832 to 1857.

References

External links 
 

1795 births
1877 deaths
People from Chelmsford
Baronets in the Baronetage of the United Kingdom
Alumni of Trinity College, Cambridge
People educated at Winchester College
Alumni of Jesus College, Cambridge
Tory MPs (pre-1834)
UK MPs 1830–1831
Conservative Party (UK) MPs for English constituencies
UK MPs 1832–1835
UK MPs 1835–1837
UK MPs 1837–1841
UK MPs 1841–1847
UK MPs 1847–1852
UK MPs 1852–1857